Guerlesquin is a commune in the Finistère department of Brittany in north-western France.

Population
Inhabitants of Guerlesquin are called in French Guerlesquinais.

See also
Communes of the Finistère department
Parc naturel régional d'Armorique
Boss Metalzone

References

External links

Official website  

Mayors of Finistère Association 

Communes of Finistère